Pazanan Deli Ali Penah Beygi (also Romanized as Pāzanān Delī ʿAlī Penāh Beygī; also known as Pāzanān) is a village in Sarrud-e Jonubi Rural District, in the Central District of Boyer-Ahmad County, Kohgiluyeh and Boyer-Ahmad Province, Iran. In 2006, its population was 15, in six families.

References 

Populated places in Boyer-Ahmad County